Nora Johnson (January 31, 1933 – October 5, 2017) was an American author.

Early life
Nora Johnson, daughter of filmmaker Nunnally Johnson and Marion Byrnes, was born in Hollywood, California in 1933. She was educated at the Brearley School, Abbot Academy, and Smith College, from which she graduated in 1954. Her sister was the film editor Marjorie Fowler.

Writings
Her first novel, The World of Henry Orient, inspired by her experiences at the Brearley School, was published in 1956,  and was made into a motion picture starring Peter Sellers in 1964. Her influential article Sex and the College Girl, was published in the November 1957 issue of The Atlantic Monthly, discussing attitudes towards sex on American campuses.

Johnson's other works include A Step Beyond Innocence (Little, Brown, 1961); Loveletter in the Dead-Letter Office (Delacorte, 1966); Flashback: Nora Johnson on Nunnally Johnson (Doubleday, 1979); You Can Go Home Again: An Intimate Journey (Doubleday, 1982); The Two of Us (Simon & Schuster, 1984); Tender Offer (Simon & Schuster, 1985); Uncharted Places (Simon & Schuster, 1988); Perfect Together (E. P. Dutton, 1991).

Death
Johnson died on October 5, 2017, in Dallas, Texas; cause of death was not specified.

References

External links
Official website

Sex and the College Girl online at The Atlantic
 

1933 births
2017 deaths
20th-century American novelists
20th-century American women writers
American women novelists
People from Hollywood, Los Angeles
Smith College alumni
Writers from Los Angeles
Brearley School alumni
Novelists from New York (state)
American women non-fiction writers
20th-century American non-fiction writers
21st-century American women